Mika Niskala (born 28 March 1981) is a Finnish former footballer. Niskala served as captain in the Veikkausliiga for IFK Mariehamn, and has also represented FC Inter Turku and Swedish IFK Norrköping.

References
Guardian Football

External links
 

1981 births
Living people
Finnish footballers
Finland youth international footballers
Finnish expatriate footballers
Veikkausliiga players
Alta IF players
FC Inter Turku players
IFK Norrköping players
Expatriate footballers in Norway
Expatriate footballers in Sweden
Association football midfielders
People from Mariehamn
Sportspeople from Åland